The successor of multiple historical Canadian mining and energy companies, EWL Management Limited was an Alberta based corporation that owned five decommissioned mines in Ontario, including three former uranium mines. 

The company was one of seven companies in Canada which managed decommissioned uranium mines and, as of 2016, held 2% of all uranium tailings in Canada.

The company was a subsidiary of Ovintiv, and dissolved into Ovintiv in February 2022.

Corporate history 
In 1996, Conwest Exploration Company Limited was acquired by Alberta Energy Company, which became AEC West. AEC became Encana with legacy mines being moved into the holding of subsidiary EWL Management.  

The company was registered on October 17, 2007 in Alberta, originally as 356823 Alberta Ltd, changing its name to EWL Management Limited in 2009.

Encanada, and EWL, became part of Ovintiv in 2019, and is now known as Ovintiv Canada ULC.

Assets 
EWL Management Limited owned five decommissioned mines in Ontario:

 Madawaska Uranium Mine, Bancroft,
 Dyno Uranium Mine, Bancroft,
 Greyhawk Uranium Mine, Bancroft,
 Coldstream Copper Mine, Burchell Lake Area, Thunder Bay, and
 Gordon Lake Mine, near Werner Lake in the Kenora District.
The company managed 4,600,000 tonnes of uranium tailings at former mines, which in 2016 represented 2% of all uranium tailings in Canada.

Operations 
Since two of EWL's mines contaminated local groundwater, EWL were rehabilitating mines to meet provincial water safety standards. This included rehabilitating two tailing management areas at Madawaska Mine. The rehabilitation was managed by Golder Associates with the aim to make the site compliant with Canada's Nuclear Safety and Control Act and Ontario's Mining Act.

Dissolution 
EWL dissolved into Ovintiv in on February 22, 2022. The Canadian Nuclear Safety Commission obliged Ovintiv to meet the licensing requirements of the two licenses WNSL-W5-3101.1/2034 and WNSL-W5-3100.0/2036.

See also 
 Mining in Canada
 Uranium mining in the Bancroft area

References 

Uranium mining companies of Canada
Canadian companies established in 2007
2007 establishments in Alberta
Companies based in Alberta

Canadian companies disestablished in 2022
2022 disestablishments in Alberta